Chess has been played in Armenia since the early Middle Ages; however, it was institutionalized during the early Soviet period. Highly popular in Armenia today, chess gained widespread recognition during the 1960s, when Soviet Armenian grandmaster Tigran Petrosian became the World Chess Champion. A country of about three million people, Armenia is considered one of the strongest chess nations today, and a chess superpower. Among countries, Armenia has one of the most chess grandmasters per capita.

Since the country's independence, the Armenian men's chess team has won the European Team Championship (1999), the World Team Championship (2011) and the Chess Olympiad (2006, 2008, 2012). The women's team had its crowning victory at the 2003 European Championship. As of August 2021, Armenia ranks seventh in the world by the average rating of its top players. Levon Aronian, formerly Armenia's best chess player, has placed as high as world No. 2 in the FIDE rankings, and has been a World Champion candidate on six occasions.

Since the 2011–12 school year, chess lessons have been made part of the curriculum in every public school in Armenia, making it the first country in the world to make chess mandatory in schools.

Name
Until the early 20th century, chess was known in Armenian as čatrak (ճատրակ), from Middle Persian chatrang. Another name was ճատրկուց, čatrkuts. Today, that term—pronounced jadrag—is only used in Western Armenian, which is spoken in the Armenian diaspora. In modern Eastern Armenian, the variation used in Armenia, chess is known as šaxmat . It is derived from Russian šáxmaty (шахматы), itself a derivative from Persian šâh mât, literally meaning "the king is at a loss" or "the king is helpless." The latter Persian phrase is also the etymology of the English checkmate.

History

Early history
In  their 1936 book on the history of chess, historians Joseph Orbeli and Kamilla Trever suggest that chess was known in Armenia since at least the 9th century during the Arab rule. According to them, the game was brought to Armenia by the Arabs from India, where the game is believed to have been originated in the sixth century as Chaturanga. In 1967 chess pieces were excavated by archaeologists in the citadel of Dvin, the medieval Armenian capital. Chess is mentioned in manuscripts from the 12th–13th centuries, kept in the Matenadaran in Yerevan, including by Vardan Areveltsi and Mkhitar Anetsi. Until the mid-20th century villagers in Shenavan, in the Aparan area, used homemade chess figures similar to medieval ones.

Soviet period
Chess in Armenia was institutionalized after the establishment of Soviet rule in 1920. In 1926–27, by the initiative of chemist Simon Hovyan (1869–1942), sections about chess started appearing in many Armenian newspapers. Hovyan contributed to the popularization of chess in Armenia by giving lectures about the game and translating books by Emanuel Lasker, Ilya Maizelis (ru), and Yakov Rokhlin (ru) into Armenian.

The first chess competitions were held in 1927, when the Armenian Chess Federation was founded. Until 1934 chess players from Armenia competed in the Transcaucasian championship. In 1934 the first Armenian Chess Championship was held in Yerevan. Genrikh Kasparyan became its winner. In later years Kasparyan won the championship nine times and became the most-titled Armenian chess player with ten national championship wins. The women's championship was also held the same year, Sirush Makints and Margarita Mirza-Avagian shared the champion title. The first Armenian chess club was founded in Yerevan in 1936. Chess clubs were also founded in Leninakan (now Gyumri) and Kirovakan (now Vanadzor) in the 1950s. By the early 1980s all towns and districts (rayons) of Soviet Armenia had chess clubs.

Chess became particularly popular with the unprecedented success of Tigran Petrosian in the 1960s. Born in Tiflis, the current capital of Armenia's neighbor Georgia, he started his ascent in Armenia with a 1946 victory at the national championship. He then won the Soviet champion title four times (1959, 1961, 1969, 1975). In 1963 Petrosian became the World Chess Champion, defeating Mikhail Botvinnik, another Soviet representative. Petrosian's victory not only popularized the game of chess, but also "led to an outpouring of patriotic fervour" in the smallest Soviet republic. "From that moment on, chess became a national obsession." Many couples named their sons Tigran, after Petrosian. Besides being World Champion for six years (1963 to 1969), Petrosian won the Chess Olympiad nine times with the Soviet team (1958 to 1974).

The USSR Chess Championship was held in Yerevan twice, in 1962 and 1975.

In 1962, there were 30,000 chess players in Soviet Armenia, as well as 3,000 instructors and judges. By 1986 the number of chess players had increased to 50,000, including three grandmasters: Rafael Vaganian, Smbat Lputian, and Arshak Petrosian. In the late Soviet period, Rafael Vaganian (1989) and Artashes Minasian (1991) became Soviet Champions. Vaganian also won the Olympiad with the Soviet team twice in 1984 and 1986.

Independent Armenia
Armenia gained its independence from the Soviet Union in 1991. Since then, Armenian chess players have had the opportunity to represent the Republic of Armenia. Three major chess tournaments have taken place in independent Armenia: the 32nd Chess Olympiad was held at the Sports & Music Complex in Yerevan in 1996; the 2001 World Team Chess Championship and the 2014 European Individual Chess Championship were held at the Yerevan Opera Theater.

Armenia earned its first medal at the 1992 Chess Olympiad, finishing third. Armenia won bronze medals at the 2002 and 2004 Olympiads as well. The Armenian team made a breakthrough with the sensational victory at the 2006 Chess Olympiad. They also won the 2008 and 2012 Chess Olympiads. Their record at the World Team Championships has been similarly outstanding, finishing third in 1997, 2001, and 2005, and winning in 2011. At the European championships the team performed somewhat more poorly, placing third in 1997, first in 1999, and second in 2007.

Chess in schools
In 2011, the Ministry of Education of Armenia made chess part of the primary school curriculum along with such standards as math and history for children over the age of 6. Chess is compulsory for second, third and fourth graders. Over $1.5 million was spent on the program. The inclusion of chess in schools was generally received positively by the public, but some parents claimed that their children's school program was already complicated and overloaded. Grandmaster Smbat Lputian argued that "bringing chess into schools is the best way to build the future." Grandmaster Rafael Vaganian criticized the program as "farce."

The decision was widely reported in the international media. Journalists, chess experts and officials in various countries praised the program and advised its adoption in their respective countries. During his visit to Armenia in 2014 Magnus Carlsen stated: "I think Armenia's experience of teaching chess in schools is a great example for the whole world." As of 2020, chess is taught in grades 2 to 4 with two classes a week.

Recent developments
On December 12, 2019 the United Nations (UN) designated 20 July as World Chess Day as proposed by the Armenian delegation. It marks the date in 1924 when the International Chess Federation was established.

As of 2021, Armenia's statistics agency recorded 4,969 chess players (including 1,318 females), up from 1,846 (375 females) in 2005 and 184 coaches (including 36 females) up from 87 (17 females) in 2005.

In August 2022, when he met with the men's team that won a silver medal at the 44th Chess Olympiad, Armenia's Prime Minister Nikol Pashinyan said Armenia should aim to win the World Chess Championship by 2050. His government has listed it as a strategic goal for Armenia.

Armenian diaspora
A number of ethnic Armenian chess players have achieved success outside of Armenia. Most notably, in 1985, Garry Kasparov, born in Baku, Soviet Azerbaijan to an Armenian mother and Russian Jewish father, became World Champion. Although he never represented Armenia and is only half-Armenian, some sources preferred to call him Armenian, partly because his last name is the Russified form of his mother's Armenian last name Kasparyan. 

Other notable Armenian diaspora chess players include Sergei Movsesian (Czech Republic, Slovakia), Yury Dokhoian and David Paravyan (Russia), Levon Ashotovich Grigorian (Uzbekistan), Tatev Abrahamyan, Samuel Sevian, Varuzhan Akobian, Melikset Khachiyan (United States), Dina Kagramanov and Natalia Khoudgarian (Canada), José Bademian Orchanian (Uruguay), Krikor Mekhitarian (Brazil), Knarik Mouradian (Lebanon).

Institutions
The national governing body for chess, the Armenian Chess Federation, was founded in 1927. Serzh Sargsyan, then Defense Minister, was elected its president in 2004 and was reelected in 2011. Sargsyan "is known for enthusiastically supporting Armenian chess players." On one occasion, Sargsyan stated that "We don't want people to know Armenia just for the earthquake and the genocide. We would rather it was famous for its chess." The Armenian government provides grandmasters with salaries and perks.

The Chess Academy of Armenia (Հայաստանի շախմատի ակադեմիա) is a leading education institutions of chess in Armenia. It was founded in 2002 by the initiative of Grandmaster Smbat Lputian and supported by then-Prime Minister Andranik Margaryan. The academy has also organized international and national chess tournaments.

National championship

The first Armenian championship occurred in 1934 when it was part of the Transcaucasian SFSR. Championships were held sporadically in the Armenian SSR until 1945, when they became an annual event; this practice has been continued in independent Armenia. Genrikh Kasparyan has won it the most times (10 times), followed by Ashot Anastasian (8 times), Levon Grigorian (6 times) and Artashes Minasian (6 times).

The first woman's championship also took place in 1934, but was not held again till 1939. Some of the most notable women champions include Elina Danielian (6 times), Lilit Mkrtchian (4 times) and Siranush Andriasian (3 times).

Media

In 1972, the magazine Chess in Armenia (Շախմատային Հայաստան Shakhmatayin Hayastan) was founded by Gaguik Oganessian. It was published monthly until 1997, when it became a weekly magazine. In 1972, the TV show Chess-64 (originally named Chess School) started to be aired by the Public Television of Armenia. Hosted by Gaguik Oganessian, it is the "longest lived program series" in the channel's history. Another more recently created show, Chess World, is aired after the First News.

Individual statistics
FIDE, the World Chess Federation, lists 24 active Armenian grandmasters, 4 woman grandmasters, 17 international masters and 4 woman international masters.

Men
The Top 10 Armenian grandmasters as of August 2022 are listed below.

Women
The Top 10 women Armenian chess players are listed below as of August 2022.

Team records

Chess Olympiads

Open (Men's)

Women's

World Team Championships

Men's

Women's

European Team Championships
Men's

Women's

Club championships
In 1995, the Yerevan city club won the European Chess Club Cup men's tournament. In 2006, the Yerevan MIKA club won the European Club Cup women's tournament.

See also

Armenian Chess Championship
Armenian draughts
Chess Federation of Armenia
Grünfeld Defence, Nadanian Variation
List of Armenian chess players
Tigran Petrosian Chess House

References
Notes

Citations

External links
Chess in Armenia magazine
Armenian Chess Federation website